Maharao Ijyaraj Singh is an Indian politician and a titular monarch. He was the member of parliament representing the Kota constituency in the Lok Sabha. He is a member of the Kota royal Rajput family who were the rulers of the erstwhile state of Kotah during the British Raj. Singh contested and won  his seat in the 2009 Lok Sabha elections, on the ticket of the Indian National Congress, defeating Shyam Sharma of the Bharatiya Janata Party.

On 29 January 2022, he succeeded his father as the titular Maharao of Kotah.

References

Maharajas of Rajasthan
People from Kota, Rajasthan
Rajasthani politicians
Indian National Congress politicians
Living people
India MPs 2009–2014
Lok Sabha members from Rajasthan
Bharatiya Janata Party politicians from Rajasthan
1965 births
Indian National Congress politicians from Rajasthan